Lawrence Adam Frank (born August 23, 1970) is an American basketball coach who is currently working as the President of Basketball Operations for the Los Angeles Clippers of the National Basketball Association (NBA). He formerly served as head coach of the Detroit Pistons and the New Jersey Nets, and has been an assistant coach for the Boston Celtics and the Nets.

Frank was honored the 2020 NBA Executive of the Year Award after acquiring both Paul George and Kawhi Leonard during the 2019 offseason.

Early life and education 
Frank was born in New York City, and grew up in Teaneck, New Jersey. He graduated from Teaneck High School in 1988, but he never made the school's basketball team. He attended Camp Greylock for Boys, a sports camp in the Berkshires. Frank, who is Jewish, played for a Jewish Community Center team and was also a player-coach for a Catholic Youth Organization team.

He earned his B.S. in education from Indiana University in 1992, where he spent four seasons as a manager for the Hoosier basketball team coached by Bob Knight. During his time at Indiana the Hoosiers won the Big Ten Conference championship twice, once in the 1988–89 season and again in the 1990–91 season. His senior year, during the 1991–92 season, Indiana reached the 1992 NCAA Final Four, but fell to Duke in a foul-plagued game in Minneapolis.

Frank has frequently cited Knight as a role model and mentor. Asked what he learned most of Knight, he said, "It's more of what he stood for. If you work hard and are trustworthy it will carry you a long way. Master your subject matter, have confidence, be reliable and sincere. He is a great mentor and teacher to have at age 18. With him you started at the bottom and were given nothing. Everything you got, you earned—sweat equity."

Coaching career

Assistant coach
Frank served as an assistant coach at the University of Tennessee for three seasons under Head coach Kevin O'Neill. Frank first worked with O'Neill as a staff assistant at Marquette University in 1992 and during his tenure, helped lead the Marquette Warriors to two NCAA tournament berths and a Sweet Sixteen appearance in 1994.

Frank then spent three seasons as an assistant coach for the Vancouver Grizzlies under Brian Hill. Hill would later serve as Frank's assistant with the New Jersey Nets. His responsibilities with the Grizzlies included scouting upcoming opponents as well as practice and bench coaching duties.

Head coach
Frank became the interim head coach of the New Jersey Nets on January 26, 2004, succeeding Byron Scott, after serving as an assistant coach with the team since the 2000–01 season. He officially became the head coach of the Nets on June 21, 2004.

Frank began his NBA head coaching career by achieving a 13–0 record from January 27 to February 24, 2004, setting a new NBA record for the most consecutive wins by a rookie NBA head coach. The 13-game winning streak was also the longest winning streak of a rookie head coach in any of North America's four major professional sports leagues. During this streak, the Nets won six consecutive games on the road, giving Frank the mark for the most road-game wins by a rookie head coach.

The Nets picked up the extension option in Frank’s  contract on June 6, 2006, and added a two-year extension on July 23, 2007. However, Frank's tenure as Nets head coach ended on November 29, 2009, after the Nets began the season with an 0–16 record. This streak was ongoing at the time of his dismissal and continued afterwards. Frank was the only coach ever in the NBA to start and end his tenure with a team with a double-digit winning streak and losing streak. Following his firing, Frank worked as an analyst for NBATV. On July 15, 2010, Frank was hired by the Boston Celtics, replacing Tom Thibodeau as the lead assistant coach on Doc Rivers' coaching staff.

On August 3, 2011, Frank was introduced as the head coach of the Detroit Pistons.

After a loss to Oklahoma City Thunder on November 12, 2012, the Pistons fell to 0–8. This made Frank the third coach in the history of the NBA to start at least 0–8 with two separate franchises.

On April 18, 2013, Frank was fired by the Pistons after going 54–94 in two seasons.

On June 28, 2013, he gave in to rookie coach Jason Kidd's rather public recruiting efforts to make Frank (who had coached Kidd when he played for the Nets) his lead assistant coach on the now-Brooklyn Nets. Frank's contract made him the highest-paid assistant coach in the NBA at the time (approximately $6 million over 6 years). Preferring to delegate his authority, Kidd stated that Frank's role would be to run the team's defense, while being Kidd's head-coaching mentor. Kidd placed another assistant coach, John Welch, in charge of the team's offense.

On December 3, 2013, Frank was demoted—relegated by Nets head coach Jason Kidd to merely filing team evaluation reports. This so-called "re-assignment" meant that Frank would be banned from being on the bench during games and from even attending team practices. This resulted from escalating tensions and squabbling between the two over the 'right' coaching philosophies, strategies, and tactics for the team.

On September 25, 2014, Frank joined the Los Angeles Clippers staff after reaching a buyout agreement with the Nets.

Executive career
On June 30, 2016, the Clippers promoted him to Executive Vice President of Basketball Operations.

On August 4, 2017, Frank was promoted to President for Basketball Operations, replacing Doc Rivers. Clippers chairman Steve Ballmer removed Rivers from his position as team president to focus on his role as head coach.

Personal life 
Frank has a wife and two daughters and lives in New Jersey during the offseason.

In addition to his degree from Indiana University Bloomington, Frank also holds an M.S. in education administration from Marquette University.

Head coaching record 

|-
| style="text-align:left;"|New Jersey
| style="text-align:left;"|
| 40||25||15||.625|| style="text-align:center;"|1st in Atlantic||11||7||4||.636
| style="text-align:center;"|Lost in Conference Semifinals
|-
| style="text-align:left;"|New Jersey
| style="text-align:left;"|
| 82||42||40||.512|| style="text-align:center;"|3rd in Atlantic||4||0||4||.000
| style="text-align:center;"|Lost in First Round
|-
| style="text-align:left;"|New Jersey
| style="text-align:left;"|
| 82||49||33||.598|| style="text-align:center;"|1st in Atlantic||11||5||6||.455
| style="text-align:center;"|Lost in Conference Semifinals
|-
| style="text-align:left;"|New Jersey
| style="text-align:left;"|
| 82||41||41||.500|| style="text-align:center;"|2nd in Atlantic||12||6||6||.500
| style="text-align:center;"|Lost in Conference Semifinals
|-
| style="text-align:left;"|New Jersey
| style="text-align:left;"|
| 82||34||48||.415|| style="text-align:center;"|4th in Atlantic||—||—||—||—
| style="text-align:center;"|Missed playoffs
|-
| style="text-align:left;"|New Jersey
| style="text-align:left;"|
| 82||34||48||.415|| style="text-align:center;"|4th in Atlantic||—||—||—||—
| style="text-align:center;"|Missed playoffs
|-
| style="text-align:left;"|New Jersey
| style="text-align:left;"|
| 16||0||16||.000|| style="text-align:center;"|(fired)||—||—||—||—
| style="text-align:center;"| —
|-
| style="text-align:left;"|Detroit
| style="text-align:left;"|
| 66||25||41||.379|| style="text-align:center;"|4th in Central||—||—||—||—
| style="text-align:center;"|Missed playoffs
|-
| style="text-align:left;"|Detroit
| style="text-align:left;"|
| 82||29||53|||| style="text-align:center;"|4th in Central||—||—||—||—
| style="text-align:center;"|Missed playoffs
|- class="sortbottom"
| style="text-align:center;" colspan="2"|Career
| 614||279||335|||| ||38||18||20||.474||

References

External links 
 Coaching statistics at Basketball-Reference.com

1970 births
Living people
American men's basketball coaches
Basketball coaches from New Jersey
Basketball coaches from New York (state)
Boston Celtics assistant coaches
Brooklyn Nets assistant coaches
Detroit Pistons head coaches
Indiana University Bloomington alumni
Jewish American sportspeople
Los Angeles Clippers assistant coaches
Marquette Golden Eagles men's basketball coaches
Marquette University alumni
New Jersey Nets assistant coaches
New Jersey Nets head coaches
People from Demarest, New Jersey
Sportspeople from Bergen County, New Jersey
Sportspeople from New York City
Teaneck High School alumni
Tennessee Volunteers basketball coaches
Vancouver Grizzlies assistant coaches
21st-century American Jews